Doğankaya is a village in the Adaklı District, Bingöl Province, Turkey. The village is populated by Kurds and had a population of 409 in 2021.

The hamlet of Çukurağıl is attached to the village.

References 

Villages in Adaklı District
Kurdish settlements in Bingöl Province